is one of the original 40 throws of Judo as developed by Kano Jigoro. It belongs to the third group of the traditional throwing list in the Gokyo no waza of the Kodokan Judo. It is also part of the current 67 Throws of Kodokan Judo. It is classified as a hip technique (koshiwaza).

Technique Description 
 Graphic from http://www.judoinfo.com/techdraw.htm

Exemplar Videos:
 Tournament from http://www.judoinfo.com/video8.htm
 Demonstrated from http://www.judoinfo.com/video4.htm, http://www.suginoharyu.com.

Technique History

Similar Techniques, Variants, and Aliases 
English aliases:
Lifting hip throw
Variants:
Otsuri goshi (large hip throw)
Kotsuri goshi (small hip throw)
Similar:
O goshi
Uki goshi

See also
 Judo technique
 The Canon Of Judo

Judo technique
Throw (grappling)